G-Stoned is an EP released by Austrian duo Kruder & Dorfmeister.

Track listing 
 "Definition" – 5:09
 "Deep Shit (Pt. 1 and 2)" – 6:22
 "High Noon" – 6:26
 "Original Bedroom Rockers" – 6:07

Liner Notes 
 All instruments, writing, production – Kruder & Dorfmeister  
 Artwork by – Oka  
 Other (Musical Doping) – Kloss, Schatzl, Weber  
 Photography – Heller

Cut 1: Recorded at TIC Music Studios || Cut 2: Recorded at GStone Studio One || Cuts 3 & 4: Recorded at GStone Studio One & Two.

Album cover 
The cover of G-Stoned features a black and white photograph of the duo in specific poses and arrangement and sans-serif title lettering – in a manner that reenacts the cover of Simon & Garfunkel's Bookends.

1996 EPs
Kruder & Dorfmeister albums